Mussorgsky is a 1950 Soviet biopic film directed by Grigori Roshal, about the emergence of Russian composer Modest Mussorgsky. It was entered into the 1951 Cannes Film Festival.

Plot
The film tells about the activities of the association of composers "The Five", who were drawing inspiration from Russian folk art. Like many representatives of the Russian intelligentsia, members of this musical community were imbued with the plight of the peasants and sought to write works that would draw people's attention to this poorest layer of society.

The young composer Modest Mussorgsky decides to devote his life to music and to make it the property of the people. Only his mother supports his “ignoble” undertakings. The young man leaves military service and ponders writing a work about the peasants, together with members of The Five.

The Imperial Musical Society is not pleased with the activities of composers; it excludes Mily Balakirev. The writer Vladimir Stasov expresses his opinion by calling the Society newspaper musical liars, eventually ending up in court for libel, and being sued for a monetary penalty. During a trial, many supporters of "The Five" are presented.

A peasant music school, created by composers, is described for debts. Meanwhile, not one of the editions of Mussorgsky’s opera Boris Godunov was allowed to appear in the imperial theaters. The directorate surrenders when the whole city begins to protest; the opera is a tremendous success. Boris Godunov radically changes the direction of the work of Russian composers.

Cast
 Aleksandr Borisov as Modest Mussorgsky
 Nikolay Cherkasov as Vladimir Stasov
 Vladimir Balashov as Mily Balakirev
 Yuri Leonidov as Alexander Borodin
 Andrei Popov as Nikolai Rimsky-Korsakov
 Bruno Freindlich as César Cui
 Fyodor Nikitin as Alexander Dargomyzhsky
 Lyubov Orlova as Yuliya Platonova
 Lidiya Sukharevskaya as Grand Duchess Elena Pavlovna
 Vladimir Morozov as Ivan Melnikov
 Georgy Orlov as Osip Petrov
 Grigory Shpigel as von Metz
Uncredited:
 Ram Lebedev as Ilya Repin
 Nikolay Trofimov as student
 Valentin Yantsat as Filaret Mussorgsky
 Igor Dmitriev, cameo

References

External links

  Mussorgsky on YouTube
  Mussorgsky and Some Musicology Questions (1951) on Music Academy journal site

1950 films
1950 drama films
1950s historical drama films
1950s biographical drama films
Soviet biographical drama films
Russian biographical drama films
1950s Russian-language films
Films directed by Grigori Roshal
Films about classical music and musicians
Films about composers
Films set in the 19th century
Modest Mussorgsky